Chachua is a Georgian surname. Notable people with the surname include:

Akaki Chachua (born 1969), Georgian wrestler
Ambrosiy Chachua (born 1994), Ukrainian footballer
Salome Chachua (born 1990), Georgian dancer and choreographer

Georgian-language surnames
Surnames of Georgian origin